Redbud Hollow consists of two historic homes located at Union Corner near Martinsburg, Berkeley County, West Virginia. They are two log buildings built about 1750.  Each building has a massive stone chimney.

It was listed on the National Register of Historic Places in 1980.

References

Houses on the National Register of Historic Places in West Virginia
Houses completed in 1750
Houses in Berkeley County, West Virginia
National Register of Historic Places in Berkeley County, West Virginia
Log buildings and structures on the National Register of Historic Places in West Virginia